This is a list of South Korean football transfers in the winter transfer window 2012–13 by club. Only transfers of both K League Classic (Division 1) and K League Challenge (Division 2) are included.

K League Classic

Busan IPark

In:

Out:

Chunnam Dragons

In:

Out:

Daegu FC

In:

 
 

 

 

Out:

Daejeon Citizen

In:

 

 

Out:

Gangwon FC

In:

 

Out:

Gyeongnam FC

In:

Out:

Incheon United

In:

Out:

Jeju United

In:

Out:

Jeonbuk Hyundai Motors

In:

Out:

Pohang Steelers

In:

Out:

Seongnam Ilhwa Chunma

In:

Out:

FC Seoul

In:

Out:

Suwon Samsung Bluewings

In:

Out:

Ulsan Hyundai

In:

Out:

K League Challenge

FC Anyang

In:

 

 

Out:

Bucheon FC 1995

In:

Out:

Chungju Hummel FC

In:

Out:

Goyang Hi FC

In:

Out:

Gwangju FC

In:

Out:

Police FC

In:

Out:

Sangju Sangmu Phoenix

In:

Out:

Suwon FC

In:

Out:

References

South Korean
2012-13
Transfers
Transfers